Micael Dahlén (born 18 June 1973) is a Swedish author, public speaker and Professor of marketing and consumer behavior at the Stockholm School of Economics, Sweden. His award-winning research within marketing, creativity and consumer behavior has been published in four books and numerous journal articles. Dahlén's books have reached a global audience, rights being sold to countries such as the U.S, U.K, Germany, South Korea, Russia and Brazil. In 2013 Dahlén stated in an interview that he was writing a novel.

Academic career

Dahlén earned his PhD in 2001 from the Economic Research Institute at Stockholm School of Economics. Dahléns PhD thesis, "Marketing on the Web: empirical studies of advertising and promotion effectiveness", challenged the traditional logic of Web advertising and suggested that Internet marketing could be much more effective if designed and evaluated differently.
As a researcher, Dahlén rose rapidly to take up a leading position in the field of consumer behavior, creativity and marketing. Only 34 years old he was made Professor. In the same year, 2008, Journal of Advertising ranked Dahlén as number 10 in the world among researchers within the field of advertising. 
Dahlén has also established the full-semester specialization course called Marketing Communication XL at Stockholm School of Economics.

Writing

Dahlén has written six books on diverse topics such as marketing, happiness, serial-killers and social media which have been translated into a number of languages.

Creativity Unlimited: Thinking Inside the Box for Business Innovations

Dahlén's first public success was the book "Creativity Unlimited: Thinking Inside the Box for Business Innovations", in which he book suggested that we do not need to 'think outside the box' in our quest for creativity, rather we should rethink the way we look 'inside the box'. The book was praised for "demystifying the process of creativity".

Nextopia

In the book "Nextopia" Dahlén states that we live in an expectation society, a society where we are constantly striving towards our next job, the next big thing, the next date. We are striving towards a Nextopia that holds the promise that our greatest pleasures and adventures lie ahead. With a set of ideas and theories about sex, drugs and rock 'n roll as natural expressions of human nature, Dahlén explains how this change in society and human mind impacts companies' and their ways of working, as well as how it impacts us as individuals.

Monster

In his latest book "Monster" Dahlén chose a topic differing from his previous work: Serial-killers and the human fascination for evil. Dahlén travelled across the globe to interview famous murderers, such as Charles Manson and the Japanese cannibal Issei Sagawa. The goal was to answer the question of how killing another person can make someone an international superstar, admired by millions? Dahlén also conducted several studies of his own on, i.e. how people perceive murderers and how many murders, fictional or real, that a person is exposed to on an average day. Dahlén also coined the term "Mansonomics" to describe how people, not only the murderers themselves, profit from these horrible acts.

Bibliography

References

External links
 Micael Dahléns official website
 Stockholm School of Economics website

1973 births
Living people
Swedish business theorists
Stockholm School of Economics alumni
Academic staff of the Stockholm School of Economics